Pedomicrobium australicum is a bacterium from the genus of Pedomicrobium.

References

Further reading 
 

Hyphomicrobiales
Bacteria described in 1988